No Control is the fourth studio album by American rock musician Eddie Money. The album was released on June 11, 1982, by Wolfgang Records and Columbia Records. It was Platinum-certified in 1987, and contains the hits "Think I'm In Love" and "Shakin'."

Track listing

Personnel
Musicians
 Eddie Money – vocals, harmonica on track 5
 Jimmy Lyon – guitars, acoustic guitar on track 4
 Marty Walsh – guitars on tracks 1–4, 6, 7, 10, acoustic guitar on track 8
 Chuck Kirkpatrick – guitar on tracks 3, 11
 Ralph Carter – bass guitar, acoustic guitar on tracks 4, 5
 Gary Mallaber – drums on tracks 2–4, 10
 Gary Ferguson – drums on tracks 1, 5, 7
 Art Wood – drums on tracks 6, 8
 Tony Brock – drums on track 9
 Joe Caldo – drums on track 11
 Alan Pasqua – keyboards on tracks 1, 2, 4, 7, 10
 Randy Nichols – keyboards on tracks 1, 2, 4–6, 8-11
 Robert Blass – keyboards on tracks (1, 3, 6, 8)
 Ed Calle – saxophone on tracks 2, 10, 11

Background vocals
 Lynn Carter, Ralph Carter, Chuck Kirkpatrick, Randy Nichols, Lynn Vittorinim

Production
 Arrangements by Eddie Money
 Produced by Tom Dowd
 Engineered and mixed by Andy Johns

Charts

References

1982 albums
Eddie Money albums
Albums produced by Tom Dowd
Columbia Records albums